Larissa Suzuki, also known as Lara Suzuki, is a Brazilian-Italian-British University Professor, computer scientist, former CEO, angel investor, Government Advisor, chartered engineer, inventor, scientist, author and entrepreneur. She is also a pianist and violinist.

Suzuki works at Google as a Technical Director  in the Google's Office of the CTO bringing technical expertise in the advancements and future of Artificial Intelligence and Interplanetary Internet on Cloud Computing under the supervision of Vint Cerf. She is a Visiting Researcher at NASA Jet Propulsion Laboratory. Her continuing academic work is as a professor at University College London and University of Quebec, and as a lecturer at Oxford University and Harvard University.

Suzuki is neurodivergent and has the diagnosis of Autistic Spectrum Disorder and ADHD. Since 2003 she has been working towards increasing the representation of people of all kinds in engineering and technology.

Early life and education 
Suzuki grew up in Ribeirão Preto, São Paulo to a family of engineers, scientists and academics. At the age of 15 she went to the Universidade de Ribeirão Preto to pursue a career in music. After one year of studies she dropped from the course and went on pursuing a degree in Computer Science. Suzuki was honoured by the Brazilian Computer Society as the best student of her class. Suzuki started a MPhil degree in Electrical Engineering at the Universidade de São Paulo in the city of Sao Carlos. Her MPhil thesis created new technologies for early detection of breast cancer in women of all ages, and have paved the way to reduce radiation exposure in cancer patients by 20% – 30%. In 2015, Suzuki earned a PhD in Computer Science from University College London in a joint program with Imperial College Business School and the Massachusetts Institute of Technology for her research on smart cities  supervised by Anthony Finkelstein.

Career
She was part of the team who made the historical feat connecting clouds with Delay-tolerant networking. Her continuing academic work is at UCL where she serves as an Honorary Associate Professor in Computer Science. She was previously the UK Head of AI, Analytics and Data Management for Google, was a Director of Product Management at Oracle, and held appointments at Arup Group, City Hall, London, IBM. She served as Head of Data Science for Founders4Schools and is on its Technical Advisory Board of Workfinder supporting Sherry Coutu with the organisation's technical endeavours in Machine Learning and AI.

Suzuki's PhD thesis pioneered Data Infrastructures for Smart Cities, and she created the City Data Market Strategy of the Mayor of London, and her work was used to design Urban Platforms for over 40 European cities.

In 2012 Suzuki founded the UCL Society of Women Engineers and co-founded the Anita Borg Institute London Branch. She chairs the Tech London Advocates group on Smart Cities, and is a reviewer of grant/awards of the Royal Academy of Engineering, the Institution of Engineering and Technology, and served as a judge of the Association for Computing Machinery Global Student Research Competition. She currently serves as a DEI Committee Member of the Royal Academy of Engineering, is a Council Member of the Queen Elizabeth Prize for Engineering Ambassadors, and is a Member of the Search Committee of the QEPrize for Engineering.

Honours and awards 
Prof Dr Suzuki is an EUR ING, a Fellow of the Institute of Engineering and Technology, the Royal Society of Arts, and is a Companion (Fellow level) of the Royal Aeronautical Society. In 2022 she was elected the Top 50 Women in European Tech, has been featured in the Financial Times, and was the Woman of the Year by the Women in IT Awards. In 2021, she received the Engineer of the Year Award from "Engineering Talent Awards", in partnership with the Royal Academy of Engineering and sponsored by McLaren Racing. Her contributions to science and engineering has also been included in the Institute of Engineering and Technology "95 inspiring engineers and technologist of the past, present, and future".

She also received the "Rooke Award 2021" from the Royal Academy of Engineering for her work promoting engineering, and for developing the Interplanetary Internet and smart cities. In the same year she also received the Inspiring Fifty UK award  and was featured in the Financial Times. She holds the Freedom of the City of London and is a Freeman at the Worshipful Company of Engineers. In 2012 she was awarded the Google Anita Borg Scholarship (now known as Women Techmakers Scholarship). Other notable awards include Winner of Twenty in Data 2020, the WES Young Woman Engineer of the Year Awards 2017 (Women's Engineering Society), Recipient of the Romberg Grant (Heidelberg Laureate Foundation), 100 Next Generation of Women Leaders (McKinsey), Doctoral Student Honour Fellowship 2013–2014 (Intel) and the 2013 Architecture and Engineering Prize of the British Federation of Women Graduates.

References

External links 

Year of birth missing (living people)
Living people
British computer scientists
Women computer scientists